Pathauli railway station (station code PTLI) is a railway station located in Agra district, the Indian state of Uttar Pradesh. It belongs to North Central Railway zone and has an average elevation of 173. There are some tourist places near by Pathauli like Agra, Fatehpur Sikri, Bharatpur, Mathura and Vrindavan.

Trains 

 Haldighati Passenger
 Agra Fort–Kota Passenger
 Agra Cantt–Bayana MEMU
 Bayana–Yamuna Bdg-Agra Passenger 
 Yamuna Bdg–Agra–Bayana Passenger 
 Bayana–Agra Cantt MEMU
 Kota–Yamuna Bdg–Agra Passenger

See also

 Northern Railway zone
 Railways in Agra

References 

Railway stations in Agra
Agra railway division